The Bezirk Kufstein is an administrative district (bezirk) in Tyrol, Austria. It borders Bavaria (Germany) in the north, the Kitzbühel district in the southeast, and the Schwaz district in the southwest.

The district has a geographical area of 969.81 km², and a population of 101,321 (2012) giving a population density of 104 people per km². The administrative center is Kufstein.

The district comprises the lower part of the Tyrolean Inn valley as far as the Bavarian border, the Alpbach valley, the Brandenberg valley, Wildschönau, and Thiersee. Mountain ranges within the district include the Brandenberg Alps, Kitzbühel Alps, and the Kaisergebirge. The largest lakes are the Reintal lakes, Thiersee, Hechtsee, Hintersteiner See and Walchsee.

Administrative divisions
The district is divided into 30 municipalities, three of them are towns, and two of them are market towns.

Towns
 Kufstein (17,550)
 Rattenberg (405)
 Wörgl (12,723)

Market towns
 Brixlegg (2,809)
 Kundl (3,967)

Municipalities
 Alpbach (2,600)
 Angath (946)
 Angerberg (1,768)
 Bad Häring (2,568)
 Brandenberg (1,547)
 Breitenbach am Inn (3,321)
 Ebbs (5,239)
 Ellmau (2,659)
 Erl (1,452)
 Kirchbichl (5,363)
 Kramsach (4,609)
 Langkampfen (3,707)
 Mariastein (323)
 Münster (3,044)
 Niederndorf (2,631)
 Niederndorferberg (673)
 Radfeld (2,292)
 Reith im Alpbachtal (2,673)
 Rettenschöss (469)
 Scheffau am Wilden Kaiser (1,323)
 Schwoich (2,314)
 Söll (3,556)
 Thiersee (2,855)
 Walchsee (1,789)
 Wildschönau (4,146)

 
Districts of Tyrol (state)